is a former Japanese football player. She played for Japan national team.

Club career
Seo played for L.League club Tasaki-Shinju Kobe. She was selected Fighting Spirit prize in 1989 season.

National team career
On January 21, 1986, Seo debuted for Japan national team against India.

National team statistics

References

Year of birth missing (living people)
Living people
Japanese women's footballers
Japan women's international footballers
Nadeshiko League players
Tasaki Perule FC players
Women's association footballers not categorized by position